Disjunctive cognition is a common phenomenon in dreams, first identified by psychoanalyst Mark Blechner, in which two aspects of cognition do not match each other. The dreamer is aware of the disjunction, yet that does not prevent it from remaining. From Dr. Mark Blechner's The Dream Frontier, it states "The specifics of bizarre dream experiences may be a source of data about the different levels of perceptual processing". By careful examination of the experiences in dreams, we may gain insight into the workings of our mind/brains. The most frequent disjunction is between appearance and identity, such as "I knew it was my mother, even though it didn't look like her."
The dreamer recognizes a character's identity, even though the appearance does not match the identity. Character identity relates to facial recognition. In Blechner's The Dream Frontier he says "One theory of facial recognition is that the visual information passes from the retina through the optic nerve to the lateral geniculate nucleus and thence to the cortex, for discrimination of the features by the feature discrimination area". This is one example of data that can help validate Blechner's idea. He stated it is "a far-reaching hypothesis and will require a great deal of research to test it." But, another piece of data to support it is that people almost always start off a recollection of a dream as "It was the strangest thing" Such dreams are usually not experienced as bizarre, despite the fact that such a statement in waking life would be considered psychotic. In waking life, most people would assume that they misidentified the person and correct for it, but not in dreams. An example of disjunctive cognition is "I was the opposite of what I actually look like. I was tall and lanky like Katharine Hepburn, but not particularly attractive (Fosshage and Loew, 1987, p. 10).” 

Disjunctive cognition can also involve time perception. It is quite common to dream that as an adult, one goes back to a time and place of one's childhood. In this case, the perceived age of the dreamer is disjunctive with the setting of the dream. It is much less common to perceive the opposite: dreaming of oneself as a child, where the time and place are that of one's adulthood. However, it is common to dream of other people whom one knew at an earlier age appearing in the present. This is especially frequent in the dreams of people who have lost close relatives. For example, Aharon Appelfeld reported: "I dreamed about my parents. They had not aged since we were together sixty-three years ago in Prague, and their faces expressed amazement that I had grown older. We were briefly united in mutual astonishment, and I knew that I had something important to tell them. But, as in every profound dream, I could not get the words out."

Blechner calls disjunctive cognitions "the commonplace bizarreness of dreamlife." Some things that happen in dreams feel bizarre to the dreamer, but disjunctive cognitions usually do not. Another commonplace bizarreness of dreams is the interobject, in which the dreamer sees something between two objects, as in: I dreamt of something "between a swimming pool and an aqueduct," or "between a cell-phone and a baby." This has led researchers to ask how people determine a specific character in a dream is their "mother" or "themselves" if they do not physically appear to be. This can give insight on a person's experience with disjunctive cognition and with the person they dreamed about. The way they saw their mother could more or less be the way they viewed them from an emotional standpoint. It can also reflect the kind of relationship they had with their mother or with themselves. This can also open up a bigger insight on the meaning of dreams and how our minds work through problems we have throughout the day.   
     
Disjunctive cognitions reveal much about how the brain is organized. Blechner has suggested that whenever disjunctive cognitions occur, the two aspects of cognition that are disjunctive are handled in different parts of the brain whose mutual integration is suppressed or shifted during sleep. Disjunctive cognitions between what the person looks like and who the person is suggest two brain systems for those aspects of perception. This is supported by research in neuropsychology and neurobiology. For example, some people who have suffered strokes or other brain damage have a syndrome known as prosopagnosia. A prosopagnosic man may look at his wife of 50 years, see all of her features clearly, and yet not recognize who she is. In such people, the process of seeing is intact, but the process of facial recognition is damaged. 

There is also the phenomenon of Capgras syndrome, in which a person may feel that a close relative is actually an impostor. The features of the relative are recognizable, but the person's identity is not. And there is also Fregoli delusion, in which a person may mistakenly identify strangers as people he actually knows. In all of these syndromes, there is a disjunction between the appearance and perceived identity of the person.

References

Neuropsychology
Psychoanalytic theory